Inês Fernandes (born 28 June 1988) is a Portuguese Paralympic athlete who competes in shot put at the Paralympic Games and hammer throw, javelin throw and discus throw at the INAS World Athletics Championships and INAS Global Games.

References

1988 births
Living people
People from Valença, Portugal
Paralympic athletes of Portugal
Portuguese female shot putters
Portuguese female discus throwers
Portuguese female hammer throwers
Portuguese female javelin throwers
Athletes (track and field) at the 2012 Summer Paralympics
Athletes (track and field) at the 2016 Summer Paralympics
Medalists at the World Para Athletics Championships
Medalists at the World Para Athletics European Championships
Sportspeople from Viana do Castelo District